Zaha Hadid Architects is a British architecture and design firm founded by Zaha Hadid (1950–2016), with its main office situated in Clerkenwell, London.

Architectural work

Conceptual projects
Price Tower extension hybrid project (2002), Bartlesville, Oklahoma – pending
Guggenheim-Hermitage Vilnius, Vilnius, Lithuania, (2008–2012) – not realised
Kartal-Pendik Waterfront Regeneration, Istanbul, Turkey
Szervita Square bubble office building Budapest, Hungary – not realised
Liberland Metaverse

Major completed projects

Vitra Fire Station (1994), Weil am Rhein, Germany
Hoenheim-North Terminus & Car Park (2001), Hoenheim, France. Project architect: Stephane Hof
Bergisel Ski Jump (2002), Innsbruck, Austria
Rosenthal Center for Contemporary Art (2003), Cincinnati, Ohio, US
BMW Central Building (2005), Leipzig, Germany
Ordrupgaard annexe (2005), Copenhagen, Denmark
Phaeno Science Center (2005), Wolfsburg, Germany
Maggie's Centres at the Victoria Hospital (2006), Kirkcaldy, Scotland
Tondonia Winery Pavilion (2001–2006), Haro, Spain
Eleftheria square redesign (2007), Nicosia, Cyprus
Hungerburgbahn new stations (2007), Innsbruck, Austria
Chanel Mobile Art Pavilion (Worldwide), Tokyo, Hong Kong, New York City, London, Paris, Moscow, (2006–2008)
Bridge Pavilion (2008), Zaragoza, Spain
J. S. Bach Pavilion, Manchester International Festival (2009), Manchester, UK
CMA CGM Tower (2007–2010), Marseille, France
Pierres Vives (2002–2012), Montpellier, France
MAXXI - National Museum of the 21st Century Arts (1998–2010), Rome, Italy. Stirling Prize 2010 winner.
Guangzhou Opera House (2010), Guangzhou, People's Republic of China
Riverside Museum (2011), a development of Glasgow Transport Museum, Scotland
Heydar Aliyev Center (2007-2012), Baku, Azerbaijan
Eli and Edythe Broad Art Museum, Michigan State University, (2008–2012)
London Aquatics Centre, London, UK, (2012), a 17,500-seat venue for the 2012 Summer Olympics
Galaxy SOHO, Beijing, China (2008-2012)
Dongdaemun Design Plaza & Park (2008–2014), Seoul, South Korea
Port Authority Building (2009-2016), Antwerp, Belgium
Napoli Afragola railway station, Italy
New Maritime Terminal in Salerno, Italy
520 West 28th Street, Manhattan, New York City (2013-2018)
Citylife office tower (Storto) and residentials, Milan, Italy
Beijing Daxing International Airport terminal building (2014–2019), Beijing, China
Leeza SOHO (aka Li Ze Tower), Beijing, China (completed 2019)
North Souks Department store, Beirut, Lebanon (completed 2021)

Unfinished projects
Mandarin Oriental Dellis Cay, Villa D (planned private home was targeted for completion 2010, but cancelled in 2011 following project bankruptcy), Dellis Cay, Turks & Caicos Islands.
Nuragic and Contemporary Art Museum (2006) (on hold), Cagliari, Italy
Tokyo National Olympic Stadium in Tokyo, Japan. (Scrapped on July 2015 by Prime Minister Shinzo Abe)

Ongoing and future projects
Central Bank of Iraq Tower, Baghdad, Iraq (to be completed 2022).
Fereshteh Pasargad Hotel, Tehran, Iran (to be completed by 2022).
Central Business District Prague, Prague, Czech Republic (to be completed by 2023)
Danjiang Bridge, Taipei, Taiwan (to be completed 2022)
Navi Mumbai International Airport, Mumbai, India (Phase 1 to open in 2024)
Western Sydney Airport, Sydney, Australia (Phase 1 to open in 2026)
Chongqing Jiangbei International Airport Terminal 3B, Chongqing, China
Oppo Headquarters, Shenzhen, China (to be completed by 2025)
Port of Tallinn Masterplan 2030 for the Old City Harbour, Tallinn, Estonia (to be completed by 2030)
Unicorn Island planned development, Chengdu, China
Start-Up Exhibition and Conference Centre, Chengdu, China
Tower C at Shenzhen Bay Super Headquarters Base,  Shenzhen, China (to be completed by 2027)
Vilnius Railway Station "Green Connect",  Vilnius, Lithuania

References

Architecture firms based in London
Zaha Hadid
1980 establishments in England
Design companies established in 1980